Crystal Clear marks the second EP from David Dunn. BEC Recordings released the project on July 15, 2014.

Reception

Signaling in a four and a half star review by CCM Magazine, Matt Conner recognizes, "Crystal Clear, resonates with Dunn’s strong message and killer vocals." Shaving a half star off her rating compared to the aforementioned, Jesus Freak Hideout's Courtney Warner, realizes, "Dunn provides a pleasant listening experience, even though it's got a familiar feel." Jonathan Francesco, indicating in a four star review for New Release Tuesday, replies, "David Dunn clearly threw all he had into this release and the potential shows."

Tracks

Charts

References

2014 EPs
BEC Recordings albums